William of Heytesbury, or William Heytesbury, called in Latin  Guglielmus Hentisberus or Tisberus (c. 1313 – 1372/1373), was an English philosopher and logician, best known as one of the Oxford Calculators of Merton College, Oxford, where he was a fellow.

Life
Heytesbury had become a fellow of Merton by 1330. In his work he applied logical techniques to the problems of divisibility, the continuum, and kinematics. His magnum opus was the Regulae solvendi sophismata (Rules for Solving Sophisms), written about 1335.

He was Chancellor of the University of Oxford for the year 1371 to 1372.

Works 
 1335 - Regulae solvendi sophismata (Rules for Solving Sophisms) 
 1. On insoluble sentences 
 2. On knowing and doubting 
 3. On relative terms  
 4. On beginning and ceasing 
 5. On maxima and minima 
 6. On the three categories (De tribus praedicamentis)
 1483 - De probationibus conclusionum tractatus regularum solvendi sophismata (On the Proofs of Conclusions from the Treatise of Rules for Resolving Syllogisms) - Pavia
 Liber Calculationum

Notes

Further reading 
 Sylla, Edith (1982), "The Oxford Calculators", in Norman Kretzmann, Anthony Kenny & Pinborg (edd.), The Cambridge History of Later Medieval Philosophy.
 Murdoch, John (1982), "Infinity and Continuity", in Kretzmann, Kenny & Pinborg (edd.), The Cambridge History of Later Medieval Philosophy.
 Curtis, Wilson (1956), William Heytesbury. Medieval Logic and the Rise of Mathematical Physics. Madison: University of Wisconsin Press.

External links 
 

14th-century English mathematicians
14th-century philosophers
14th-century English writers
14th-century Latin writers
Scholastic philosophers
Fellows of Merton College, Oxford